The 2001 Women's Hockey Champions Trophy was the 9th edition of the Hockey Champions Trophy for women. It was held between 18–26 August 2001 in Amstelveen, Netherlands.

Argentina won the tournament for the first time after defeating the Netherlands 3–2 in the final.

Teams
The participating teams were determined by International Hockey Federation (FIH):

 (Host nation and defending champions)
 (Champions of 2000 Summer Olympics and 1998 World Cup)
 (Second in 2000 Summer Olympics)
 (Fourth in 2000 Summer Olympics)
 (Fifth in 2000 Summer Olympics)
 (Sixth in 2000 Summer Olympics)

Squads

Head Coach: Sergio Vigil

Head Coach: David Bell

Head Coach: Kim Chang-back

Head Coach: Marc Lammers

Head Coach: Jan Borren

Head Coach: Jack Holtman

Umpires
Below are the 9 umpires appointed by the International Hockey Federation:

Michele Arnold (AUS)
Peri Buckley (AUS)
Renée Cohen (NED)
Ute Conen (GER)
Lyn Farrell (NZL)
Soledad Iparraguirre (ARG)
Jane Nockolds (ENG)
Monica Rivera (ESP)
Kazuko Yasueda (JPN)

Results
All times are Central European Summer Time (UTC+02:00)

Pool

Classification

Fifth and sixth place

Third and fourth place

Final

Awards

Statistics

Final standings

Goalscorers

References

External links
Official FIH website

Women's Hockey Champions Trophy
Champions Trophy
Hockey Champions Trophy Women
International women's field hockey competitions hosted by the Netherlands
Sports competitions in Amstelveen
Hockey Champions Trophy Women